The Russian route A322, also known as "Barnaul – Rubtsovsk – the border with Kazakhstan", is a road in Russia. Its length is about 332 km.

Gallery

References 

Roads in Russia